Northern France may refer to:

the north of France, especially:
the region of Hauts-de-France
the former region of Nord-Pas-de-Calais
Nord (French department)
the area in which the northern French dialects, the langues d'oïl, were spoken during the Middle Ages

See also
Southern France